An incomplete list of events which occurred in Italy in AD 1409:

 Battle of Sanluri on the island of Sardinia
 Council of Pisa elects Antipope Alexander V
 Ladislaus of Naples invades Tuscany
 Theodore II puts an end to French domination of Genoa

Births
 Alessandro Sforza
 Bernardo Rossellino

Deaths
 Alberico da Barbiano
 Martin I of Sicily

References

Italy
Italy
Years of the 15th century in Italy